Dindica discordia is a moth of the family Geometridae first described by Hiroshi Inoue in 1990. It is found on Luzon and Palawan in the Philippines and on Sumatra in Indonesia.

References

Moths described in 1990
Pseudoterpnini